Walsall Hospital Radio, established 18 March 1978, was an internally broadcasting hospital radio station based at the Manor Hospital in Walsall, West Midlands. It was a registered charity, staffed by approximately 25 unpaid volunteers who supported the station by either presenting shows, helping with station administration, fundraising or all three. Following a period of inactivity, it officially closed in 2018.

History

Walsall Hospital Radio originally started broadcasting under the name 'Radio Lions' on 18 March 1978. The station was named after the Walsall Lions Club who had set it up and initial broadcasts took place on Sunday mornings from a converted bathroom at the top of the hospital's Salisbury Wing.

The station moved to its final home at the top of St. John's Wing On 8 October 1983 and expanded steadily during the eighties with the station's popular live broadcasts from Walsall FC matches commencing in 1988.

In 1992 Walsall Hospital Radio adopted its current name after outgrowing the stewardship of the Walsall Lions Club. 1992 was also the year in which the station's main studio was refurbished and a proper mixing desk installed.

The station's second studio had been re-equipped in early 2002 with a mixing desk and additional playback equipment. It was officially opened by ex-Walsall Hospital Radio, then Heart FM, DJ Tushar Makwana. WHR purchased a computer playout system in 2003 enabling the station to broadcast 24 hours a day.

Following a period of inactivity, Walsall Hospital Radio was removed from the list of registered charities in 2018 due to it ceasing to exist.

Volunteer roles
The station was run by approximately 25 part-time volunteers, ranging in age from 17 to over 60. Staff perform tasks including –

Presenting
Shows were primarily presented in the evenings or at weekends, although some volunteers would occasionally host shows during the daytime as well. Following a training period lasting between 4–8 weeks, new volunteer presenters were able to fill a vacant slot and host a show of their choosing. The station had a wide range in terms of broadcast content with presenters hosting shows playing music from Country to R&B, Bhangra to Rock and also spoken word and sport programmes etc.  

Upon joining Walsall Hospital Radio, new volunteers interested in presenting were initially placed with the station's Training Officer who teaches them the basics of operating the mixing desk. Items on the syllabus include how to properly cue tracks, how to use the computer playout system and how to configure the studio patch board. Once the new volunteers were confident in the studio they were then assigned to a presenter and sit in on his/her show for 3–4 weeks as an observer. The final stage of the training process involved making a demo tape of an off-air show which if reviewed by either the Training Officer or the Programme Manager. Providing that the demo tape is acceptable, the new volunteer was then able to take up a show of their own.

Shows were presented either solo or with up to two co-presenters. Both studios were connected to internal phone lines allowing patients to phone in direct to interact with live shows, for example to make requests or dedications. The phone lines were integrated with the mixing console meaning that callers could be put on air. DJs were able to bring in their own records or use the station's record library and computer system, the library was especially useful for locating older albums and songs. Audio could be played from many different sources including CD, MiniDisc cassette, Vinyl and from portable digital devices via a radio transmitter adapter tuned into the mixing desk's receiver.

Station Administration
 Administration can include tasks such as responding to correspondence, updating the record library, recruitment, walking the wards to collect requests, maintenance and training. The task of station administration was generally spread out across the volunteer staff, although some members took special responsibility for jobs requiring specific knowledge such as studio maintenance, the website etc.

As the station was normally unmanned during daytime in the working week, checking for, and responding to, answer phone messages is an important job and will be done at least twice a week. Post was also read and acted upon as required with special items such as bills being forwarded on to the appropriate person at the station. In addition to post and telephone correspondence, volunteers would also check for new emails. This is done as regularly as possible because new volunteers often first approach the station via email.

Studio maintenance tasks included updating the station's digital record library and taking care of any problems with the broadcasting facilities. Volunteers can use specialist programmes installed on the station's computers to import music from CDs or to download it from the internet and then add it to the existing record library. Routine maintenance usually involved replacing blown bulbs, debugging networking, configuring wiring etc.

A volunteer committee was responsible for WHR's day-to-day activities and meets on a casual basis. A station AGM for all volunteer staff is held once a year, usually in January. The following table details the role of each WHR Committee position –

Fundraising
As Walsall Hospital Radio was not funded by Manor Hospital, fundraising is an especially important role. Volunteers would both arrange and take part in regular fundraising events for the station. Frequently employed fundraising methods include –

 Table Top Sales – Held in the hospital's entrance foyer and involved station volunteers selling items donated to the station. Bric-a-brac style items such as videos, books and ornaments are commonly found on the table and are priced according to their condition. Sales last for the duration of an afternoon, usually during visiting hours and raise between £30–60.
 Tin Shakes – Station volunteers take donation tins out into the centre of Walsall and encourage members of the public to make contributions. Tin Shakes are seen as useful because they help raise awareness of the station's cause, although they can be tricky to arrange requiring permission from the town council several weeks in advance.
Broadcast Marathons – The station holds 'broadcast marathons' either once or twice annually. They work by volunteers collecting sponsorship to take part in an extended broadcast spanning 48 hours with the aim to span the denoted period unbroken. The most recent broadcast marathon, held in late 2007, raised approximately £450.

Station Funding

Walsall Hospital Radio received no funding from either Manor Hospital or Walsall PCT. Instead, money was raised by volunteers through a number of different activities and occasional charitable grants.

Regular fundraisers held to support the station include table top sales in the hospital's entrance lobby, broadcast marathons, beer & skittle evenings, and tin shakes out in Walsall town centre. In addition to these campaigns, the station also generates some revenue in the form of donations through its official website.

In recent years the station has benefited from charitable grants from institutions including the National Lottery's 'Awards for All' scheme, Walsall CVS and from funding from local businesses.

Money was required to cover costs including routine studio maintenance, utility bills and broadcasting licences. WHR's operating costs for the year 2007 were approximately £3140.

Equipment

Walsall Hospital Radio had two studios, a record library and a computer room.

The main studio, Studio 1, was equipped with twin Citronic CD players, twin Denon cassette decks, two Technics record turntables, three Sony MiniDisc players, a computer playout system, a Sherwood radio tuner and a Broadcast Series EELA SBM mixing desk. There are three microphones connected to the mixing desk and seating for three. The studio also has a television mounted on the ceiling, used primarily for accessing weather reports through Teletext.

Studio 2 was a backup studio, normally used only if there was a technical problem with Studio 1. It has a smaller Partridge Electronics mixing desk suitable for one person and was equipped with twin Denon CD players, JVC cassette decks, Sony Minidisc players and a Technisc turntable. Studio 2 also houses two computer servers on which the bulk of the station's digital music library was held.

There are three computers in the studio's computer room, one being a modern flat screen model and the other two being significantly older. They have access to a printer and share a single 56K dial up internet connection.

Walsall Hospital Radio's physical record library holds both vinyl LPs and CDs with the collection being fully indexed. Some of the equipment required for broadcast inside the hospital was also located in the record library, which was next door to Studio 1.

Future plans
Walsall Manor Hospital completed an extensive redevelopment programme being carried out by construction company Skanska. Part of the plans for redevelopment include knocking down St. John's Wing, which homed the Walsall Hospital Radio studios. Space for new studios was reserved in the Maternity Wing. Plans for the new studio allowed the station's new premises to be more spacious than previously and possibly better equipped (subject to fundraising). While the redevelopment was completed, limited fundraising by Walsall Hospital Radio prevented the refurbishment of modern technology.

Station photos

References

Hospital radio stations
Walsall
Charities based in the West Midlands (county)
Lions Clubs International
Radio stations established in 1978